Prince Dahal (born 19 June, 2004) is a Nepalese badminton player. He won the 2018 Dubai international junior series. He reached a career high of world number seventh of the world junior ranking in March 2020. In 2022, he was ranked number one junior player in the world. In the 2019 South Asia Under 21 Championships he won a silver medal.

References

2004 births
Living people
People from Darchula District
Nepalese male badminton players
South Asian Games bronze medalists for Nepal
South Asian Games medalists in badminton